Birdman of Alcatraz is a 1962 American biographical drama film directed by John Frankenheimer and starring Burt Lancaster. It is a largely fictionalized version of the life of Robert Stroud, who was sentenced to solitary confinement after having killed a prison guard. A federal prison inmate, he became known as the "Birdman of Alcatraz" because of his studies of birds, which had taken place when he was incarcerated at Leavenworth Prison where he was allowed to keep birds in jail. When moved to Alcatraz, Stroud was never allowed to keep any birds.

The film was adapted by Guy Trosper from the 1955 book by Thomas E. Gaddis. It was nominated for Academy Awards for Best Actor in a Leading Role (Burt Lancaster), Best Actor in a Supporting Role (Telly Savalas), Best Actress in a Supporting Role (Thelma Ritter), and Best Cinematography, Black-and-White.

Plot
Robert Stroud is imprisoned as a young man for committing a murder in Alaska. He is shown as a rebellious inmate, fighting against a rigid prison system: while being transported with other prisoners by train, he breaks open the window to allow the suffocating inmates to breathe.

He comes into conflict with Harvey Shoemaker, warden of Leavenworth Prison.

While in jail, Stroud learns that his mother tried to visit him but was denied and told to return later in the week. Outraged, he attacks a guard, fatally stabbing him. Stroud is sentenced to death, but his mother runs a successful campaign to have his sentence commuted to life in prison. The sentence requires him to serve in solitary confinement for the rest of his life.

While in the exercise yard during a heavy rainstorm, Stroud finds a downed nest holding an orphaned baby sparrow. He takes care of the bird, and starts a trend. He and other convicts acquire and care for birds, such as canaries, given from outside sources.

Stroud develops a collection of birds and cages. When the birds fall ill, he conducts experiments and comes up with a cure. As the years pass, Stroud becomes an expert on bird diseases and publishes a book on the subject. His writings are so impressive that a doctor describes him as a "genius".

Stroud is later visited by bird-lover Stella Johnson and agrees to go into business, marketing his bird remedies. He and Stella later marry, but his mother disapproves. This causes a permanent rift between mother and son and further disowns him by refusing to support his release petition. He is abruptly transferred to the federal penitentiary at Alcatraz, a new maximum-security institution where he is not permitted to keep birds. Although growing elderly, he remains independent, writing a history of the U.S. penal system that is suppressed by Shoemaker, now warden of the Rock.

Still at odds with authority, Stroud helps end a prison rebellion in 1946 by throwing out the two firearms acquired by the convicts. He assures the authorities that they can now re-enter the premises without risk of being shot. Shoemaker acknowledges Stroud never lied to him and takes him at his word.

After a petition campaign by admirers, Stroud is eventually transferred to another prison in Missouri. During the move, he meets several reporters and displays a range of knowledge on more than just birds, such as the technical details of a passing jet aircraft. He meets author Thomas E. Gaddis, who wrote a book based on his life.

Cast

Production

Development
British director Charles Crichton was picked for this film and his United States debut, but he clashed with Lancaster and was replaced by Frankenheimer.   According to actor Strother Martin, "I had a nice role in Birdman of Alcatraz. They fired the original director, Charles Crichton, and I went out with him.  I was replaced by Leo Penn who was eventually cut out of the picture entirely." Despite the title being the Birdman of Alcatraz, Stroud never kept any birds during his time in Alcatraz prison, but rather during his time incarcerated at Leavenworth Prison from 1912 to 1942.

The film was made despite the protests of James V. Bennett, director of the Federal Bureau of Prisons. During a visit to Washington in July 1961, Gaddis was unsuccessful in trying to meet with Bennett, given Bennett's views on the film which he deplored because "it is simply not our policy to glamorize criminals". Bennett approached Twentieth-Century Fox, the studio which had optioned the book, and told them he did not want the film to be produced, in response to which the studio ended their involvement. Producers had to make changes to the script at the behest of the United States Navy and the United States Army in order to receive co-operation in producing the film. Producer Harold Hecht took little notice of the federal pressures, suggesting he would even ask for permission to film at Alcatraz.

Casting
Burt Lancaster was cast in the lead role of Robert Stroud. Maurie Siegel, who was responsible for the film's publicity, noted that Lancaster "gave up eight months of his life to the picture" and that he gave up a million dollars in lost opportunities from other engagements, to ensure the film was done how he wanted it. Lancaster's mild-mannered portrayal of Stroud was starkly different to the real life persona of Robert Stroud, who author Jolene Babyak compared to being more like Ted Bundy and suggested that cures he promoted for birds were actually potentially lethal.

On being cast as Feto Gomez, Telly Savalas said he "was in awe" of Lancaster, despite saying he was never nervous when interviewing famous figures including Harry Truman and Dwight Eisenhower. He recalled how "I couldn't catch my breath in the presence of Burt Lancaster", who he credited as launching his career and remained among Savalas' favorite performers.

Gaddis was originally tested to play himself in the film, though experts suggested that the illusion is lost if someone plays themself and the role ultimately went to Edmond O'Brien. O'Brien studied the mannerisms of Gaddis to try and replicate them and even reluctantly smoked the same cigarillos, although hoped that his scenes would not take too long so that he would be able to stop smoking. He worked in capacity of technical advisor on the film and attended set every day. He emphasized that "the film won't gloss over the facts of Stroud's criminal history", hoping that the film would get him released from prison, as the book got him transferred from Alcatraz prison.

Filming
The movie began filming during the fall of 1960 under the working title of The Man from Alcatraz. Lancaster began filming after concluding his previous movie A Matter of Principle. As shooting was not permitted within Alcatraz itself, the sets were constructed within two buildings situated at Columbia Studios. For the prison laundrette scene which lasts for around 90 seconds, an entire steam laundry from 1914 was brought on set, complete with all piping and machinery which was operational. For scenes in Stroud's isolation cell, the small set size meant that the movie camera required around a third of the amount of available space.

The movie features many birds being friendly around Lancaster, to which he explained they had been specially trained by two men brought on to the set from Japan. Lancaster advised that on some days, they would "get a scene with the birds right off", yet other times it may take an entire day, suggesting that the short concentration span of the birds would mean they could entirely forget what they needed to do and therefore had to be retrained. Hollywood animal trainer Ray D. Berwick was among the bird trainers in the film. The cages were recreated from cigar boxes by skilled carpenters over a period of many hours, according to Martha Gaddis.

Post production
Gaddis served as technical director for the filming of his book and spent all his time on the film set from September 1960. Unlike Lancaster, who requested that he remain on set at all times to ensure an accurate portrayal of his character, Gaddis was "eager to be released" after 6 months on set.

In publicizing the film, Lancaster went on a cross-country tour. When in San Francisco at the Mark Hopkins Hotel, he invited questions from journalists about Robert Stroud. At the press conference, Lancaster made his views clear that he believed Stroud should be released, even offering to visit Washington to try and use his influence to help the cause. When asked by an interviewer if some of the film's profits would be used to help fund Stroud's release, Lancaster shouted at him, "You're nothing but a ****, a ****."

Warden James F. Maroney declined United Artists' invitation to show the film in Alcatraz to inmates, after a special screening was set up for him and three of his staff. In explaining his reasons, Maroney said that "prison life is always fascinating to people who never have been confined in a prison." He went on to say that he and his staff "found the film interesting and occasionally, but not always, realistic", but suggested that the inmates would prefer to watch entertainment that distracts them from their environment, rather than one which reminds them of their current one.

Theatrical release
The film opened at theaters on July 3, 1962 in Los Angeles before expanding to the entire country.

Reception
Rotten Tomatoes, a review aggregator, reports that 91% of 23 surveyed critics, both contemporaneous and modern, gave the film a positive review; the average rating is 7.3/10. One of the first critic's reviews of the film by Philip K. Scheuer praised it as "one of the finest pieces of film-making to come out of Hollywood in many a disappointing day", describing Lancaster's performance as "an astonishing tour de force." In discussing the film's prison setting, Variety wrote, "Birdman reverses the formula and brings a new breadth and depth to the form."  A. H. Weiler of The New York Times called it "a thoughtful yet powerful portrait that cleaves to the heart and mind despite its omissions".

Some former inmates who knew Stroud criticized the film's portrayal of the man. Former Alcatraz inmate Glenn Williams said that Stroud "was not a sweetheart; he was a vicious killer. I think Burt Lancaster owes us all an apology". Another former convict, Jim Quillan, described the real Stroud as a "jerk", and as "a guy that liked chaos and turmoil and upheaval... Always at somebody else's expense".

Awards and nominations

The film is recognized by American Film Institute in these lists:
 2006: AFI's 100 Years...100 Cheers – #76

See also
 List of American films of 1962

References

External links

 
 
 
 
 
 Crime Library article on Robert Stroud
 

1960s biographical drama films
1960s prison films
1962 drama films
1962 films
Alcatraz Island in fiction
American biographical drama films
American black-and-white films
American prison drama films
Films about capital punishment
Films based on biographies
Films directed by John Frankenheimer
Films produced by Burt Lancaster
Films produced by Harold Hecht
Films scored by Elmer Bernstein
Films set on islands
Films set in Kansas
Films set in San Francisco
Films set in the San Francisco Bay Area
Norma Productions films
United Artists films
1960s English-language films
1960s American films